Viru Prison is a regional prison in Jõhvi, Estonia.

Estonian Ministry of Justice started preparations for establishment of Viru Prison in 2001, and the prison was officially established on July 13, 2006.

Viru Prison complex incorporates 1000 closed beds and a 75-bed open unit operated by the Estonian Department of Prisons. A 150-bed house of detention, under the control of the national police, augments the prison facility. To gain the best security possible, all buildings are connected with upper-air gallery, leading from one building to another.

Gallery

External links
Maquette of Viru Prison
Viru Prison

Prisons in Estonia
Jõhvi
Buildings and structures in Ida-Viru County
2006 establishments in Estonia